Year of the rat refers to a year associated with the Rat zodiac symbol in the Chinese calendar.

Year of the Rat may also refer to:

 Year of the Rat (game), a board wargame
Year of the Rat (play), a play by Roy Smiles
 "The Year of the Rat", an episode of Mighty Max
 "Year of the Rat", a song by Badly Drawn Boy on the album One Plus One Is One
 "Year of the Rat", a song by The Whitlams on the album Little Cloud
 "Year of the Rat", a song by Tristania on the album Rubicon